Tarver is a surname. Notable people with the surname include:

Antonio Tarver (born 1968), American boxer
Clay Tarver (born 1965), American guitarist and writer
Ed Tarver, American attorney and politician
H. Micheal Tarver, author, historian, and professor
Jason Tarver, American football coach
John Tarver, American football player
Hurley Tarver (born 1975), American football player
Katelyn Tarver (born 1989), American actress and singer
La Schelle Tarver (born 1959), American baseball player
Malcolm C. Tarver (1885–1960), U.S. Representative from Georgia
Quindon Tarver (1982–2021), African-American singer
Ray Tarver (1921–1972), American dentist and politician